Garrett Matthew Giemont is a strength and conditioning coach who has worked for 30 years at the professional level with several teams in the National Football League (NFL) as well as in Major League Baseball (MLB).

Early life
Giemont grew up in southern California where he got into the NFL on the ground floor at age 12 as a ball boy for the Los Angeles Rams.  He played football in high school, but any thought of a playing career was ended by knee injuries.  He attended Fullerton College where he earned a degree in physical education.

Coaching career
Giemont                              began his career as a training assistant with the Rams in 1970.  He worked his way up the Rams organization, eventually becoming the team's strength and conditioning coach in 1990.

Giemont left the Rams in 1992 to become the director of physical development for Major League Baseball's Chicago Cubs.  With the Cubs he helped develop such players as Greg Maddux and Sammy Sosa.

Giemont returned to the NFL in 1995, taking a job as the strength coach of the Oakland Raiders.  He remained with the Raiders under four head coaches through the 2002 season.  In 2002, Giemont was named Coach of the Year by the Professional Football Strength and Conditioning Coaches Society.

In 2003 Giemont was hired as strength coach of the Tampa Bay Buccaneers,  rejoining head coach Jon Gruden, under whom Giemont had coached in Oakland. The Buccaneers let Giemont go in 2006.

Mike Tomlin brought Giemont in as the strength and conditioning coordinator for the Pittsburgh Steelers in  shortly after taking over for Bill Cowher as head coach. Tomlin had previously worked with Giemont on the Buccaneers coaching staff.

Personal life
Giemont and his wife, Sonya, have two sons — Jackson and Jett.

References

1959 births
Living people
Chicago Cubs coaches
Oakland Raiders coaches
Tampa Bay Buccaneers coaches
Pittsburgh Steelers coaches
American strength and conditioning coaches